Cheryl Savageau (born April 14, 1950) is a writer and poet of Abenaki descent.

Biography
Savageau is of Abenaki and French descent. Her father, Paul Savageau is French/Abenaki, her mother, Cecile Meunier Savageau, is French-Canadian.

Savageau was born in Worcester, Massachusetts, but grew up in a small island neighborhood on Lake Quinsigamond in Shrewsbury. She refers to this lake and her childhood growing up along the shore in her children's book Muskrat Will Be Swimming. She graduated from Clark University with a Bachelor of Science degree with focus on English and Philosophy.

It was in college that she really discovered her passion for writing and the connection it gave her to readers. Poetry and storytelling became Savageau's outlet for sharing stories about her ancestors and her Native culture.

She was a founding member of Oak and Stone Storytellers, a storytelling group that told stories in concert to adults as well as to children in schools and libraries.

During her career, Savageau has won numerous awards for her work. Her children's book, Muskrat Will Be Swimming, was a Smithsonian Notable Book (1996) award winner, won the Skipping Stones Award for children's Environmental Books (1997), and the Best Children's Book Award (1997), from Wordcraft Circle of Native Writers and Storytellers. For her work mentoring young and beginning writers, she was awarded Mentor of the Year from Wordcraft Circle of Native Writers and Storytellers (1998).

Savageau has also won various fellowships for poetry including the Massachusettes Artists Foundation and the National Endowment for the Arts.

Her writing focuses on retelling Abenaki stories, including the stories of women and the working class. Also a visual artist, she has exhibited her quilts, paintings and other works.

Publications

Autobiography

Poetry

Children's books

Anthology contributions

 Sunken Garden Poetry, Brad Davis, ed. Wesleyan University Press, Middletown, Ct. 2012
Living in Storms. Tom Schram, ed. Eastern University Press, 2008.
French Connections: A Gathering of Franco-American Poets. Christine Gelineau, ed. Louisiana Literature Press, 2007.
New Directions Reading, Writing, and Critical Thinking. Peter S. Gardner,ed. Cambridge University Press, New York, 2005.
Approaching Literature in the 21st Century. Peter Schakel and Jack Ridl, eds. Bedford/St. Martin's Press, Boston. 2005.
 Poetry from Sojourner: A Feminist Anthology, Ruth Lepson, ed. University of Illinois Press, Urbana, Illinois. 2004
Connections: Reading and Writing in Cultural Contexts. Judith A. Stanford, ed. Rivier College, Mayfield Publishing, Calif. 2001.
My Home As I Remember It. Native Women in the Arts Press, Toronto, Ontario, Canada, 1999.
The Eye of the Deer. Carolyn Dunn Anderson and Carol Comfort, eds. Aunt Lute Books, 1999.
Poetry Nation. Regie Cabico and Todd Swift, eds. Véhicule Press, Montréal, Canada, 1999.
Identity Lessons: Learning American Style. Maria Mazziotti Gillan and Jennifer Gillan, eds. Viking Penguin, 1999.
Approaching Poetry: Perspectives and Responses. Peter Schakel and Jack Ridl, eds. St. Martin's Press, 1997.
Through the Kitchen Window. Arlene Arvakian, ed. University of Massachusetts, Spring, 1997.
Durable Breath. John E. Smelcer and D.L. Birchfield, eds. Salmon Run Press, 1994.
Two Worlds Walking. Diane Glancy and C.W. Truesdale, eds. New Rivers Press, 1994.
Returning the Gift. Joseph Bruchac, ed. Greenfield Review Press, 1994.
Poetry Like Bread Martín Espada, ed. Curbstone Press, 1994.
An Ear to the Ground. Marie Harris and Kathleen Aguero, eds. University of Georgia Press, 1989.

References

Further reading

External links

 Cheryl Savageau at the Poetry Foundation
 Cheryl Savageau at Native American Authors, Internet Public Library
 
 Dawnland Voices page

1950 births
Living people
Abenaki people
Native American poets
American women poets
Native American children's writers
American children's writers
Writers from Massachusetts
People from Worcester County, Massachusetts
American feminist writers
Clark University alumni
Native American women writers
American women children's writers
21st-century American women